Akira Kibe  (born October 7, 1976) is a Japanese mixed martial artist. He competed in the flyweight and bantamweight divisions.

Mixed martial arts record

|-
| Loss
| align=center| 18-13-2
| Toshinori Tsunemura
| Decision (Unanimous)
| Deep: Nagoya Impact 2014
| 
| align=center| 2
| align=center| 5:00
| Kasugai, Japan
| 
|-
| Win
| align=center| 18-12-2
| Harushige Shinokawa
| Submission (Rear-Naked Choke)
| Deep: Nagoya Impact: Kobudo Fight
| 
| align=center| 1
| align=center| 4:24
| Kasugai, Japan
| 
|-
| Loss
| align=center| 17-12-2
| Sota Kojima
| TKO (Punches)
| Deep: Nagoya Impact: Kobudo Fight
| 
| align=center| 1
| align=center| 1:34
| Nagoya, Japan
| 
|-
| Loss
| align=center| 17-11-2
| Yuki Motoya
| KO (Head Kick)
| Deep: Nagoya Impact 2012: Kobudo Fight
| 
| align=center| 1
| align=center| 0:18
| Nagoya, Japan
| 
|-
| Win
| align=center| 17-10-2
| Akito Sakimura
| TKO (Punches)
| Deep: Nagoya Impact 2012: Kobudo Fight
| 
| align=center| 1
| align=center| 4:44
| Nagoya, Japan
| 
|-
| Win
| align=center| 16-10-2
| Takashige Hirukawa
| Submission (Armbar)
| Deep: Nagoya Impact: Kobudo Fight
| 
| align=center| 1
| align=center| 2:17
| Kasugai, Japan
| 
|-
| Win
| align=center| 15-10-2
| Hirotaka Himeno
| TKO (Punches)
| Deep: clubDeep Nagoya: Kobudo Fight 3
| 
| align=center| 1
| align=center| 4:50
| Nagoya, Japan
| 
|-
| Win
| align=center| 14-10-2
| Hirotaka Miyakawa
| TKO (Punches)
| Deep: Cage Impact 2011 in Nagoya
| 
| align=center| 1
| align=center| 1:49
| Nagoya, Japan
| 
|-
| Win
| align=center| 13-10-2
| Isao Terada
| Decision (Majority)
| Deep: clubDeep Nagoya: Kobudo Fight 2
| 
| align=center| 2
| align=center| 5:00
| Nagoya, Japan
| 
|-
| Win
| align=center| 12-10-2
| Sho Nonaka
| TKO (Punches)
| Deep: clubDeep Nagoya: Kobudo Fight
| 
| align=center| 1
| align=center| 2:53
| Nagoya, Japan
| 
|-
| Win
| align=center| 11-10-2
| Satoshi Watanabe
| Decision (Unanimous)
| Deep: Cage Impact in Nagoya
| 
| align=center| 2
| align=center| 5:00
| Nagoya, Japan
| 
|-
| Loss
| align=center| 10-10-2
| Tomohiko Hori
| TKO (Punches)
| Deep: clubDeep Tokyo in Shinkiba 1st Ring
| 
| align=center| 2
| align=center| 4:23
| Tokyo, Japan
| 
|-
| Win
| align=center| 10-9-2
| Shinobu Aoyama
| Submission (Rear-Naked Choke)
| Shooto: Gig Central 19
| 
| align=center| 1
| align=center| 3:04
| Nagoya, Aichi, Japan
| 
|-
| Win
| align=center| 9-9-2
| Kunihiro Watanabe
| Submission (Rear-Naked Choke)
| Deep: clubDeep Hamamatsu
| 
| align=center| 1
| align=center| 0:36
| Hamamatsu, Japan
| 
|-
| Win
| align=center| 8-9-2
| Tsuyoshi Okada
| Decision (Unanimous)
| Shooto: Gig Central 15
| 
| align=center| 2
| align=center| 5:00
| Nagoya, Aichi, Japan
| 
|-
| Win
| align=center| 7-9-2
| Masayuki Demise
| Decision (Majority)
| Deep: clubDeep Toyama: Barbarian Festival 7
| 
| align=center| 2
| align=center| 5:00
| Toyama, Japan
| 
|-
| Loss
| align=center| 6-9-2
| Junya Kodo
| KO (Punches)
| Shooto: Gig West 9
| 
| align=center| 1
| align=center| 1:38
| Osaka, Kansai, Japan
| 
|-
| Win
| align=center| 6-8-2
| Ryota Matsui
| TKO (Punches)
| Deep: clubDeep Hamamatsu
| 
| align=center| 1
| align=center| 1:01
| Hamamatsu, Japan
| 
|-
| Loss
| align=center| 5-8-2
| Kohei Fujiwara
| TKO
| Powergate: Kaiser Grand Prix 2007 Second Round
| 
| align=center| 1
| align=center| 2:05
| Osaka, Kansai, Japan
| 
|-
| Win
| align=center| 5-7-2
| Nakashige Tokuoka
| Submission (Armbar)
| Powergate 14: Kaiser Grand Prix 2007 First Round
| 
| align=center| 2
| align=center| 1:27
| Osaka, Kansai, Japan
| 
|-
| Loss
| align=center| 4-7-2
| Teruyuki Matsumoto
| Decision (Unanimous)
| Shooto: Gig Central 12
| 
| align=center| 2
| align=center| 5:00
| Nagoya, Aichi, Japan
| 
|-
| Win
| align=center| 4-6-2
| Takao Tamura
| TKO (Punches)
| Shooto: Gig Central 11
| 
| align=center| 1
| align=center| 4:32
| Nagoya, Aichi, Japan
| 
|-
| Draw
| align=center| 3-6-2
| Takahiro Hosoi
| Draw
| Shooto: Gig Central 9
| 
| align=center| 2
| align=center| 5:00
| Nagoya, Aichi, Japan
| 
|-
| Loss
| align=center| 3-6-1
| Hiroyuki Tanaka
| Decision (Majority)
| Shooto: Gig Central 8
| 
| align=center| 2
| align=center| 5:00
| Nagoya, Aichi, Japan
| 
|-
| Loss
| align=center| 3-5-1
| Shinobu Aoyama
| KO (Punch)
| Deep: clubDeep Toyama: Barbarian Festival 1
| 
| align=center| 1
| align=center| 4:34
| Toyama, Japan
| 
|-
| Win
| align=center| 3-4-1
| Yasuji Numa
| Submission (Armbar)
| Shooto: Gig Central 6
| 
| align=center| 1
| align=center| 1:48
| Nagoya, Aichi, Japan
| 
|-
| Win
| align=center| 2-4-1
| Manabu Kano
| Submission (Kimura)
| Shooto: Gig Central 4
| 
| align=center| 1
| align=center| 1:45
| Nagoya, Aichi, Japan
| 
|-
| Loss
| align=center| 1-4-1
| Akitoshi Hokazono
| Decision (Unanimous)
| Shooto: Gig Central 3
| 
| align=center| 2
| align=center| 5:00
| Nagoya, Aichi, Japan
| 
|-
| Loss
| align=center| 1-3-1
| Akira Komatsu
| Decision (Majority)
| Shooto: Gig Central 2
| 
| align=center| 2
| align=center| 5:00
| Nagoya, Aichi, Japan
| 
|-
| Win
| align=center| 1-2-1
| Noriyuki Yokoyama
| Decision (Majority)
| Shooto: Gig East 9
| 
| align=center| 2
| align=center| 5:00
| Tokyo, Japan
| 
|-
| Loss
| align=center| 0-2-1
| Masato Shiozawa
| Decision (Unanimous)
| Shooto: Wanna Shooto Japan
| 
| align=center| 2
| align=center| 5:00
| Setagaya, Tokyo, Japan
| 
|-
| Draw
| align=center| 0-1-1
| Akitoshi Hokazono
| Draw
| Shooto: Treasure Hunt 3
| 
| align=center| 2
| align=center| 5:00
| Kobe, Hyogo, Japan
| 
|-
| Loss
| align=center| 0-1
| Hiroki Kita
| Decision (Majority)
| Shooto: Gig East 7
| 
| align=center| 2
| align=center| 5:00
| Tokyo, Japan
|

See also
List of male mixed martial artists

References

External links
 
 Akira Kibe vs Yasuji Numa at CageRank.com
 Akira Kibe vs Noriyuki Yokoyama at CageRank.com
 Akira Kibe vs Nakashige Tokuoka at CageRank.com

1976 births
Japanese male mixed martial artists
Flyweight mixed martial artists
Bantamweight mixed martial artists
Living people